Nauris Skraustiņš (born 12 September 1978) is a Latvian luger. He competed in the men's singles event at the 2002 Winter Olympics.

References

External links
 

1978 births
Living people
Latvian male lugers
Olympic lugers of Latvia
Lugers at the 2002 Winter Olympics
Sportspeople from Riga